The Paradise is a British television costume drama series co-produced by BBC Studios and Masterpiece. The Paradise premiered in the United Kingdom on BBC One on 25 September 2012 and premiered in the United States on PBS on 6 October 2013. The series is an adaptation of Émile Zola's 1883 novel Au Bonheur des Dames that relocates the story to North East England. (Zola's novel itself is a retelling of the story of Aristide Boucicaut, the Bellême-born founder of Le Bon Marché).

A second series was commissioned by BBC One in late October 2012 and was broadcast on 20 October 2013 on BBC One.

On 12 February 2014, the BBC confirmed that The Paradise would not return for a third series. It cited that the programme had lower figures than other relatively new dramas such as Death in Paradise, Sherlock and Silk. Furthermore, its ITV rival Mr Selfridge was performing better.

Plot

Series 1
Series 1 begins in 1875, and portrays the lives and loves of the people who work, shop and trade, in and around the first English department store. The owner of The Paradise department store is widower John Moray. Moray was once a draper's boy in Emersons, the small shop that grew under his managership into The Paradise, which has come to dominate the high street to the detriment of small shopkeepers nearby.

Into this world comes Denise Lovett, from the small town of Peebles in Scotland, whose uncle Edmund is one of the shopkeepers struggling to survive. Denise takes a job at The Paradise and is soon seen by Moray as a rising star, to the annoyance of Miss Audrey, the head of ladies' fashion, and of Clara, a fellow shopgirl. Moray is financially dependent on Lord Glendenning, whose daughter Katherine is determined to marry Moray and sees Denise as a direct threat to her ambitions.

Series 2
Lord Glendenning has died and Katherine Glendenning has inherited The Paradise. She now has a husband, Tom Weston, and a young stepdaughter, Flora. Katherine asks Moray, who has been exiled to Paris, to return to revive the fortunes of The Paradise, and save it from being sold. Weston is determined to control his wife and The Paradise, overruling Moray to his own advantage.
Moray's position at the Bon Marche is a reference to Octave Mouret's derision and constant competition with the same.

Production
The series was filmed at Lambton Castle, which was converted into an 1870s bustling upmarket department store. Alongside, a Victorian street with shops and a tavern were constructed. Biddick Hall, also on the Lambton estate, was used as Lord Glendenning's house.

Cast

Main cast

Recurring and guest cast
Guest stars who played a major part in an episode were credited in the opening credits, amongst the main cast, for that specific episode. The following actors' names were included in the opening credits in at least one episode:
 Olivia Hallinan as Jocelin Brookmire, a wealthy but unhappy friend of Katherine's
 Mark Bonnar as Peter Adler, a wealthy philanthropist and suitor to Katherine
 Arthur Darvill as Bradley Burroughs, a barber who is Moray's business partner for a short time
 David Bamber as Charles Chisholm, a milliner with a shop across the street from The Paradise
 Adrian Scarborough as Joseph Fenton, one of the Fenton brothers, wealthy businessmen intent on buying The Paradise
 Kevin Guthrie as Nathaniel, one of the boys working in the loading bays at The Paradise, who is secretly employed by Mr Fenton
 Branka Katic as Clémence Romanis, a free-thinking Parisian supplier and friend of Moray's
 Julia Ford as Ruby Bell, Susy's estranged mother
 John Duttine as Campbell Balentine, the wealthy owner of a successful beer brewery
 Liz White as Lucille Balentine, a former nurse who has recently married Campbell
 Nathan Stewart-Jarrett as Christian Cartwright, a renowned photographer

Episodes

Series 1 (2012)

Series 2 (2013)

Soundtrack
A soundtrack, featuring music by composer Maurizio Malagnini from the series, was released by Silva Screen Records on 26 August 2013. The music was performed by the BBC Concert Orchestra and recorded at Air Studios, Lyndhurst Hall, London, UK. The score won a Music + Sound Award 2013.

Track listing

Releases

DVD
Series 1 was released by BBC Worldwide in a region 2 three-disc set on 3 December 2012.

Series 2 was released by 2Entertain in a region 2 three-disc set on 9 December 2013.

Series 1 and 2 were released by 2Entertain as a six-disc box set on 9 December 2013.

Blu-ray

Series 1 was released by BBC Home Entertainment in a Zone A two-disc set on 12 November 2013.

References

External links
 
 
 The Paradise PBS program page

2012 British television series debuts
2013 British television series endings
2010s British drama television series
BBC television dramas
Department stores in fiction
English-language television shows
Television shows based on French novels
Television shows set in England
Television series set in the 1870s
Television series set in shops
Television series by BBC Studios